Medicago ciliaris or ciliate medick is a plant species of the genus Medicago. It is found throughout the Mediterranean basin. It forms a symbiotic relationship with the bacterium Sinorhizobium medicae, which is capable of nitrogen fixation. It is considered by some to be a subspecies of Medicago intertexta.

External links
 International Legume Database & Information Services

ciliaris
Flora of Malta